Stenophryneta is a monotypic beetle genus in the family Cerambycidae described by Per Olof Christopher Aurivillius in 1907. Its only species, Stenophryneta variegata, was described by the same author in the same year.

References

Phrynetini
Beetles described in 1907
Monotypic beetle genera